McKenney or McKenny is a surname. Notable people with the surname include:

Charles McKenny, president of Central State Normal School (now Central Michigan University), Milwaukee 
Devon McKenney, American soccer player 
Don McKenney, Canadian ice hockey player
Eileen McKenney, sister of author Ruth McKenney
Henry William McKenney, Canadian politician
James Felix McKenney, American writer, director, producer and actor
Jim McKenny, former ice hockey defenceman and reporter
Joe McKenney, Boston College footballer
Ruth McKenney, American author
Stewart McKenny, Australian comic book artist
Thomas L. McKenney, U.S. Superintendent of Indian Trade 
Thomas McKenny Hughes, Welsh geologist
Todd McKenney, Australian entertainer
Todd McKenney (Ohio politician) 
William Robertson McKenney, U.S. Representative from Virginia